Ectoedemia tigrinella is a moth of the family Nepticulidae. It is found in the Russian Far East (Primorskiy Kray).

The larvae probably feed on Acer species and probably mine the leaves of their host plant.

Taxonomy
It was previously treated as a synonym of Ectoedemia trifasciata.

References

Moths described in 1985
Nepticulidae
Moths of Asia